Scott Baker (born 31 March 1986) is an English darts player currently playing in Professional Darts Corporation events.

Career

In 2017, Baker won the Lincolnshire Open and Welsh Masters. He qualified for the 2018 BDO World Darts Championship as the 23rd ranked player in the BDO , but he lost 3–2 to Andy Baetens in the first round. The following year, he also qualified for the tournament and won his first game 3–0 against Ross Montgomery, before a stunning comeback against reigning champion Glen Durrant fell just short in the second round.

Baker opted to enter PDC UK Q-School in January 2019 with the BDO restrictions having been lifted. Following a run to the last 16 on the first day, Baker beat Dan Lauby Jr 5–1 in the final on day two to seal a two-year PDC Tour Card.

World Championship results

BDO

 2018: 1st Round (lost to Andy Baetens 2–3)
 2019: 2nd Round (lost to Glen Durrant 3–4)

Performance timeline

External links

References

Living people
English darts players
British Darts Organisation players
1986 births
Sportspeople from Tipton
Professional Darts Corporation former tour card holders